Hemlal Bhattrai is a Bhutanese international footballer who plays for Thimphu City in the Bhutan A-Division. He made his first appearance for the Bhutan national football team in 2013.

Playing career

Club
Bhattrai has played his whole career to date for Thimphu City, finishing runner-up in the A-Division in 2012, 2013 and 2014. In each of the three seasons that Bhattrai has been playing for Thimpu City, they have qualified for the Bhutan National League competition, but have yet to finish higher than mid table.

International
Bhattrai first international cap received his first international cap for Bhutan the 2-8 loss to the Maldives in the 2013 SAFF Championship. He came on as a substitute in the game against the Maldives after Leki Dukpa was sent off for fouling a Maldivian player outside of his box. His debut was a match to forget as his first action was to pick the ball out of the back of the net, the Maldives having equalised from the resulting free kick, and he would then go on to concede a further six goals in the second half. Dukpa was suspended for the next game and Bhattrai took his place, conceding a further five goals against Sri Lanka.

References

Bhutan international footballers
Bhutanese footballers
Living people
1993 births
People from Thimphu
Bhutanese people of Nepalese descent
Association football goalkeepers